Celio Piccolomini (1598–1667) was a Roman Catholic cardinal.

Biography
On 10 Jun 1658, he was consecrated bishop by Scipione Pannocchieschi d'Elci, Archbishop of Pisa, with Neri Corsini, Titular Archbishop of Tamiathis, and Carlo de' Vecchi, Bishop Emeritus of Chiusi, serving as co-consecrators.

References

1598 births
1667 deaths
17th-century Italian cardinals
People from Siena
Cardinals created by Pope Alexander VII